Prizzi's Honor is a 1985 American black comedy crime film directed by John Huston, starring Jack Nicholson and Kathleen Turner as two highly-skilled mob assassins who, after falling in love, are hired to kill each other. The screenplay co-written by Richard Condon is based on his 1982 novel of the same name. The film's supporting cast includes Anjelica Huston (the director's daughter and Nicholson's then-girlfriend), Robert Loggia, John Randolph, CCH Pounder, Lawrence Tierney, and William Hickey. Stanley Tucci appears in a minor role in his film debut. It was the last of John Huston's films to be released during his lifetime.

Prizzi's Honor was theatrically released on June 14, 1985, by 20th Century Fox. It received critical acclaim, with praise for the performances of its cast (most notably Huston). It grossed $26 million against its $16 million budget.

The film received eight nominations at the 58th Academy Awards (including for Best Picture, Best Director, Best Actor, and Best Adapted Screenplay) with Huston winning for Best Supporting Actress. The film also won four Golden Globe Awards, including Best Actor – Motion Picture Musical or Comedy and Best Actress – Motion Picture Comedy or Musical for Nicholson and Turner, respectively.

Plot
Charley Partanna is a hitman for a New York Mafia family headed by the elderly Don Corrado Prizzi, whose business is generally handled by his sons Dominic and Eduardo and by his longtime right-hand man, Angelo, who is Charley's father.

At a family wedding, Charley is quickly infatuated with a beautiful woman he doesn't recognize. He asks Maerose Prizzi, estranged daughter of Dominic, if she recognizes the woman, oblivious to the fact that Maerose still has feelings for Charley, having once been his lover. Maerose is in disfavor with her father for running off with another man before the end of her romance with Charley.

Charley flies to California to carry out a contract to kill a man named Marxie Heller for robbing a Nevada casino. He is surprised to learn that Marxie is the estranged husband of Irene, the woman from the wedding. She repays some of the money Marxie stole as Charley naively (or willfully) believes that Irene was not involved with the casino scam. By this point they have fallen in love and eventually travel to Mexico to marry. A jealous Maerose travels west on her own to establish for a fact that Irene has double-crossed the organization. The information restores Maerose to good graces somewhat with her father and the don. Charley's father later reveals that Irene (who had claimed to be a tax consultant) is a "contractor" who, like Charley, performs assassinations for the mob.

Dominic, acting on his own, wants Charley out of the way and hires someone to do the hit, not knowing that he has just given the job to Charley's own wife. Angelo sides with his son, and Eduardo is so appalled by his brother's actions that he helps set up Dominic's permanent removal from the family.

Irene and Charley team up on a kidnapping that will enrich the family, but she shoots a police captain's wife in the process, endangering the organization's business relationship with the cops. The don is also still demanding a large sum of money from Irene for her unauthorized activities in Nevada, which she doesn't want to pay. In time, the don tells Charley that his wife's "gotta go."

Matters come to a head in California when, acting as if everything were alright, Charley comes home to his wife. Each pulls a weapon simultaneously in the bedroom. Irene ends up dead, and Charley ends up back in New York, missing her, but consoled by Maerose.

Cast
 Jack Nicholson as Charley Partanna
 Kathleen Turner as Irene Walkervisks / Irene Walker
 Anjelica Huston as Maerose Prizzi
 Robert Loggia as Eduardo Prizzi
 John Randolph as Angelo "Pop" Partanna
 William Hickey as Don Corrado Prizzi
 Lee Richardson as Dominic Prizzi
 Michael Lombard as Rosario Filangi / Robert Finlay
 C. C. H. Pounder as "Peaches" Altamont
 George Santopietro as Plumber
 Ann Selepegno as Amalia Prizzi
 Lawrence Tierney as Lieutenant Hanley
 Vic Polizos as Phil Vittimizzare
 Dick O'Neil as Bluestone
 Sully Boyar as Casco Vasorne
 Raymond Heller as Sal Bocca
 Joseph Ruskin as Marxie Heller
 Seth Allen as Alvin Gomsky
 Dominic Barto as Presto Cigilone
 Stanley Tucci as Soldier

Production
As well as working with his actress daughter, John Huston hired Meta Carpenter Wilde, the script supervisor who worked with him on The Maltese Falcon (1941) and Rudi Fehr, his film editor from Key Largo (1948).

Anjelica Huston was paid the SAG-AFTRA scale rate of $14,000 for her role in Prizzi's Honor. When her agent called up the movie's producer to request if she could be paid more, she was told "Go to hell. Be my guest — ask for more money. We don't even want her in this movie." Huston, who was not only John Huston's daughter but also Jack Nicholson's girlfriend at the time, wrote in her 2014 memoir Watch Me that she later overheard a production worker saying, "Her father is the director, her boyfriend's the star, and she has no talent." She would go on to win the Academy Award for Best Supporting Actress for her performance.

A 25-year old Stanley Tucci made his film debut in Prizzi's Honor, playing the minor role of a mafia goon.

Reception

Critical response
On Rotten Tomatoes, Prizzi's Honor holds an approval rating of 85% based on 40 reviews, with an average rating of 7.1/10. The site's critics consensus states: "Disturbing and sardonic, Prizzi's Honor excels at black comedy because director John Huston and his game ensemble take the farce deadly seriously."  

Pauline Kael wrote: "This John Huston picture has a ripe and daring comic tone. It revels voluptuously in the murderous finagling of the members of a Brooklyn Mafia family, and rejoices in their scams. It's like The Godfather acted out by The Munsters. Jack Nicholson's average-guyness as Charley, the clan's enforcer, is the film's touchstone: this is a baroque comedy about people who behave in ordinary ways in grotesque circumstances, and it has the juice of everyday family craziness in it." Roger Ebert gave the film three and half stars out of four and wrote: "This is the most bizarre comedy in many a month, a movie so dark, so cynical and so funny that perhaps only Jack Nicholson and Kathleen Turner could have kept straight faces during the love scenes."

Awards and nominations

American Film Institute
 AFI's 100 Years ... 100 Laughs - Nominated
 AFI's 100 Years ... 100 Passions - Nominated
 AFI's 10 Top 10 - Nominated (Gangster Film)

References

External links

  at MGM.com
 
 
 
 

1985 films
1980s crime comedy films
20th Century Fox films
ABC Motion Pictures films
American black comedy films
American crime comedy films
American romantic comedy films
Best Musical or Comedy Picture Golden Globe winners
1980s English-language films
Films scored by Alex North
Films about the American Mafia
Films based on American novels
Films based on romance novels
Films based on thriller novels
Films directed by John Huston
Films featuring a Best Supporting Actress Academy Award-winning performance
Films featuring a Best Musical or Comedy Actor Golden Globe winning performance
Films featuring a Best Musical or Comedy Actress Golden Globe winning performance
Films set in New York City
Films whose director won the Best Director Golden Globe
Mafia comedy films
Films about contract killing
Films produced by John Foreman (producer)
Films whose writer won the Best Adapted Screenplay BAFTA Award
Films about the Sicilian Mafia
Films about organized crime in the United States
1980s American films